Vijay A. Madgavkar (July 8, 1914 - April 13, 2004) was an Indian badminton player.  He was the first player to win men's singles in the first edition of Indian National Badminton Championships in 1934.

References

1914 births
2004 deaths
Indian male badminton players
Indian national badminton champions